Ira Richard Matthews, III (born August 23, 1957) is a former American football kick returner and punt returner. He played three seasons for the Oakland Raiders of the National Football League (NFL). Matthews stood 5'8" and weighed 175 lbs which made it difficult to catch him. He played collegiate football at the University of Wisconsin, where he led the nation in punt returns in 1978, averaging 16.9 yards per punt return, including three for touchdowns.  

Matthews was drafted by the Raiders in the sixth round (#142 overall) of the 1979 NFL Draft, where he earned recognition as one of the greatest returners in the franchise's history.  He was named to the NFL 1979 All-Pro Team as a return man during his rookie season. On October 25, 1979, Matthews set a Monday Night Football record for kick-off returns with a 104-yard return against the San Diego Chargers. Matthews was a member of the Oakland Raiders Super Bowl XV championship team. During his three seasons with the Raiders he helped lead his team to win the 1980 Wild Card, 1981 AFC West Conference Championship, and Super Bowl XV. His active NFL career ended at the end of his 1981 season due to injuries.  In three seasons, Matthews returned 95 punts for 678 yards and 71 kickoffs for 1602 yards and a touchdown.

In 1983, Matthews resurfaced in professional American football when he signed mid-season with the Boston Breakers of the United States Football League. Appearing in 5 games, he returned 13 kicks for 210 yards and 3 punts for 15 yards.

See also 
 List of NCAA major college yearly punt and kickoff return leaders

1957 births
Living people
Sportspeople from Rockford, Illinois
Players of American football from Illinois
American football running backs
American football return specialists
Wisconsin Badgers football players
Oakland Raiders players